義安 may refer to:

 Yi'an District, in Anhui, China
 E An, a military award given to members of the Taiping rebellion 
 Ngee Ann, or Yi'an in Mandarin, an old name of Chaozhou
 Yi'an Commandery (413-590), historically an administrative subdivision of Chaozhou
 Ngee Ann Polytechnic (Abbreviation: NP) an institution of higher learning (IHL) in Singapore 
 Ngee Ann City, a shopping and commercial centre in Singapore 
 Ngee Ann Kongsi, charitable foundation located in Singapore
 Sun Yee On (Chinese: 新義安), or New Righteousness and Peace Commercial and Industrial Guild, one of the leading triads in Hong Kong and China

See also
 Yian (disambiguation)
 Ngee Ann (disambiguation)